Opened in 1893, Redpath Hall was  McGill University's first dedicated library building. It is situated at 3461, rue McTavish (3461, McTavish Street). Through numerous renovations, the library was extended to the south with the addition of the Redpath Library Building and the adjacent McLennan Library, built in 1967-1969 .Today, the Redpath-McLennan complex houses the Humanities and Social Sciences Library, the largest branch of the McGill University Library.

Redpath Hall is today operated by the Schulich School of Music. The French Classical pipe organ was built by Hellmuth Wolff and donated in 1981. The Hall is also home to a large portion of the University's portrait collection, managed by the McGill Visual Arts Collection.

History
 The building was donated by Peter Redpath in 1893, who also founded the Redpath Museum at the University. The building was designed in the Romanesque style, by Sir Andrew Taylor from Edinburgh, Scotland. The library incorporates much ornamentation. There are creatures and gargoyles in the roof, including two representing Redpath and Taylor.

 The library stacks were expanded in 1900–01 by Taylor, at the request of Redpath's wife, Grace. The library was expanded again in 1921, by Percy Erskine Nobbs and George Taylor Hyde in the original Taylor style.

In 1952 the building was expanded to the south by the McDougall, Fleming and Smith architectural firm and new reading areas were added. With this expansion the east wall of the 1921 Nobbs building was enclosed and the use of the Redpath Hall as a part of the library came to an end. This expansion is now known at the Redpath Library Building and is a part of the Humanities and Social Sciences Library. When the McLennan Library Building was built in 1969 it was connected to the Redpath Library Building via a walkway between the two buildings on the main floor.

Redpath Hall is currently used as an auditorium and concert hall and has been under the management of the Schulich School of Music since June 1, 1986.

External links 
 Redpath Hall & Library 
 Humanities and Social Sciences Library
 Redpath Hall duo, Urban life through Two Lenses exhibition, McCord Museum.
Fontanus v.6. Redpath Special Issue. 1993.  McGill University Libraries

References

McGill University buildings
Libraries in Montreal
Libraries established in 1893
Redpath family
Academic libraries in Canada
Richardsonian Romanesque architecture in Canada
Romanesque Revival architecture in Canada
Percy Erskine Nobbs buildings
1893 establishments in Quebec